A list of Western films released in the 1940s.

TV series
see, List of TV Westerns

1940
Western